Levens is a village and civil parish in the South Lakeland district of the modern English county of Cumbria. It lies within the historic county of Westmorland. In the 2001 census the parish had a population of 1,007, increasing at the 2011 census to 1,049. Levens Hall is within the parish.

Governance
An electoral ward in the same name exists. This ward stretches from Helsington, then south to Heversham. The total ward population at the 2011 Census was 2,056.

Notable people
Henry Graham (of Levens) (died 1707), landowner and member of parliament
James Knox (born 1995), racing cyclist

See also

Listed buildings in Levens, Cumbria

References

External links 
 Cumbria County History Trust: Levens (nb: provisional research only – see Talk page)

Its page in the Cumbria Directory
Levens CE School

Villages in Cumbria
Civil parishes in Cumbria
South Lakeland District